KRCO (690 kHz) is a commercial sports AM radio station in Prineville in the U.S. state of Oregon. It broadcasts to the Bend area. On October 23, 2008, KRCO started broadcasting on 96.9 FM (call sign K245BC) via translator.

On April 1, 2022 KRCO changed their format from classic country (which moved to KRCO-FM 95.7 Prineville) to sports, branded as "96.9 The Ticket".

On March 13, 2023 KRCO rebranded as "92.5 The Ticket" as its K245BC translator moved from 96.9 FM in Prineville to 92.5 FM in Bend.

Previous logo

References

External links
92.5 The Ticket official website

RCO
Sports radio stations in the United States
Prineville, Oregon
Radio stations established in 1950
1950 establishments in Oregon